Luisito Campisi (born 19 February 1987, in Italy) is an Italo-Argentine ex football player.

Currently Uefa B licensed coach and Entrepreneur in the environmental field, in UE.MPCD.CO srl  & AIKU AMBIENTE srl, Companies.

Played in Italy for Atalanta B.C, Hellas Verona and Monza, and some foreign experiences in

USA (Major League Soccer, Boston New England Revolution) and Greece (Levadeiakos)

Biography
Born in Milan, Lombardy, Campisi started his career at Atalanta, played for several years for the Italian youth National Teams until Under 20. He made his Serie B debut on 17 December 2005, replacing Antonino D'Agostino in the 75th minute. He then played against Udinese Calcio in 2 Coppa Italia's Cup matches. Contracted from Atalanta for five years, he was loaned to Pizzighettone in 2006–07 season. In summer 2007, he left for Massese in a co-ownership deal. In June 2008 Atalanta bought him back and subsequently left for Hellas Verona in another co-ownership deal. In Verona he scored an outstanding goal in the derby against Calcio Padova ( https://www.youtube.com/watch?v=3IR6MVNx_nU&t=55s), historical rivals.

Verona bought him outright in June 2010 and loaned to Monza (Clarence Seedorf President) on 31 August 2010. He was the regular of the team, and scored twice at league cup matches.

He finished his playing career in lower divisions until 2017, when he decided to end his career as a player, and became a regular UEFA B licensed coach.

In 2017 with GSD LA Spezia Calcio, coaching Juniores Reg.B, Luisito won the championship and Cup, becoming Lombardy champ in his first year as a coach.

In 2018 GSD La Spezia promotes him at the lead of the first team, in the Promozione Italian League (Italian 6th League), where he concluded the season in 8th place, with 39 points.

In 2019 SC Caronnese gives him the lead of the Italian Serie D's Juniore Nazionale Under 19. He also collaborates with major team as Mr Gatti's assistant on pitch.

Luisito also participates in summer tournaments with IBS (Italian Beach Soccer), playing for Argentina, exclusive of Sky Sports Fox.

Luisito has also been an entrepreneur for several years in the environmental field: industrial cleaning and remediations, with an innovative product named MPCD, hydrocarbons disintegrator.

Worked many years with Kyani, American Network Marketing company, in the nutritional field.

References

External links

FIGC 

Italian footballers
Serie B players
Atalanta B.C. players
A.S. Pizzighettone players
Hellas Verona F.C. players
A.C. Monza players
Association football midfielders
Footballers from Milan
1987 births
Living people
S.C. Caronnese S.S.D. players